The Men's Freestyle 97 kg competition of the wrestling events at the 2022 Mediterranean Games in Oran, Algeria, was held from 27 June to 28 June at the EMEC Hall.

Results 
27 June

References

Men's Freestyle 97 kg